Bendick Murrell is a town in the South West Slopes region of New South Wales, Australia.

Locality
The town is on the Blayney-Demondrille railway line.

Name
The name of the town is Aboriginal in origin, meaning "plain" and was originally given a local pastoral station.

Services
A provisional school was established in 1883 and the existing school has occupied the same site since 1894. A receiving post office was opened in 1887. Bendick Murrell railway station opened in 1888, originally as Marengo. It was renamed Bendick Murrell in 1889. The original station was further south than the current location as the station was relocated in 1915 to allow for the expansion of grain loading facilities.

References

External links

Towns in New South Wales
Hilltops Council
Blayney–Demondrille railway line